Nina's World is an animated children's television series. It is a prequel to Sprout network's preceding and very first ever programming block, The Good Night Show, focusing on host Nina, as a 6-year-old Latina who lives with her family in Chicago, IL. It  premiered on September 26, 2015 on the Sprout network. This incarnation of Nina was introduced by Cat Greenleaf in August 2015.

Plot
Nina's World follows the adventures of Nina as a six-year-old girl in the city of Chicago. Each adventure takes Nina on new things to try. At the end, she goes to bed while knowing all about the adventure.

Voice cast
Isabella Farrier as Nina
Rita Moreno as Abuelita
Michele Lepe as Mami
David Torres as Papi 
Ulka Mohanty as Dr. Kapur 
Evans Johnson as Mavis the Post Master 
Dhirendra Miyanger as Mr. Kapur
Mandy Patinkin as Mr. Lambert
Douglas Quan as Mr. Lin
Darcy Han as Mrs. Lin
Dayton Wall as Aiden
Enrique Lopez as Carlos
Bronwen Holmes as Chelsea B.
Ethan Luu as Eddie Lin
Cristiano Batista as Nico
Gigi Saul Guerrero as Rosie
Tiana Jung as Skye Lin
Kira Tozer as Suzy
Edwin Perez as Tio Javier
Tabitha St. Germain as Claire, Mrs. Goldstein and Star
Michael Daingerfield as Radio DJ
Caitlyn Bairstow as Rhea the Raptor

Characters

Children 

Nina Sabrina Flores (also called Ninala) is the titular protagonist, voiced by Isabella Farrier. She is six years old and celebrates birthdays with Star and feeding her pet at night. She has the same name as an adult who appears in The Good Night Show. Her middle name is mentioned by her mother in "Nina Rides a Bike".
Aiden is the new kid who just moved to town and was seen as a bully in Nina's Amazing Amigos and is now a friend and is voiced by Dayton Wall.
Carlos is the best human male friend of Nina and Nico's younger brother, voiced by Enrique Lopez.
Chelsea B. is the best female friend of Nina, voiced by Bronwen Holmes. She is the daughter of Claire.
Eddie Lin is the brother of Skye voiced by Ethan Luu
Nico is Carlos big brother he know how to speak in sign language he doesn't usually seak in some episodes but in Nina's Borther for the day he is voiced by Cristiano Batista.
Rosie is voiced by Gigi Saul Guerrero (appears in "Nina Dives In").
Skye Lin is an older friend of Nina who designs kites, voiced by Tiana Jung.
Suzy is voiced by Kira Tozer (appears in "Nina the Babysitter").
Santi is Nina's little brother the appearance in Nina's Sweet Valentine Surprise as a baby then in the second season he turn 2 in half in Nina's Baker Boogie 
Natalia is Nina's Cousin that appeared in the second season The New Nina and also appeared in Nina And her Shadow 
Polly is little girl who's very shy appear in Nina's Yard Dale most in third season include Nina Finds a Kitten Nina's in Charge and Nina in The Middle

Adults 

Abuelita Yolie is the grandmother of Nina (abuelita is a Spanish term of endearment for abuela which means grandmother) and Mami's mother who teaches Nina and others stretches each episode, voiced by Rita Moreno. She is considered one of the main characters. Yolie moved from Mexico to a new home with her daughter (Nina's mami) prior to Nina's birth.
Carmen is Nina's cousin.
Claire (also spelled Clair in closed captions) is the mother of Chelsea voiced by Tabitha St. Germain.
Dr. Kapur is voiced by Ulka Mohanty.
Jorge is Carmen's fiancé. 
Mami aka Mrs. Flores is voiced by Michele Lepe, who plays the adult Nina in The Good Night Show. Nina is Mami's daughter. Like her mother Yolie, she is a Mexican immigrant.
Mavis the Post Master is voiced by Evans Johnson.
Mr. Kapur is voiced by Dhirendra Miyanger.
Mr. Lambert the town librarian voiced by Mandy Patinkin.
Mr. Lin is voiced by Douglas Quan.
Mrs. Lin is voiced by Darcy Han.
Mrs. Goldstein voiced by Tabitha St. Germain.
Papi aka Mr. Flores is Nina's father, voiced by David Torres.
Tio Javier is Nina’s uncle and a musician, voiced by Edwin Perez.
Dr Rivers is Ocean Patrol appeared in Nina's Seaside Rescue

Animals 

Hoppy is a female frog that Nina and her friend meet on the way to the library.
Hush is the pet fish of Nina, who later guest-hosts The Good Night Show with Melanie Martinez and Star before Leo replaced Melanie and then Nina replaced Leo.
Lucy is a firefly who provides light at Nina's bedside, who later guest-hosts The Good Night Show with Leo before Nina replaces him. 
Max is Carlos and Nico's mischievous, but friendly, dog.
Star is the best friend of Nina who is a Star as his name suggests, voiced by Tabitha St. Germain. He appears 2D in this show and later appears as a 3D puppet in The Good Night Show. which he originally hosts with Melanie Martinez then Leo before Nina came to replace them.
Zinky is the green alien companion of Chelsea.

Episodes

Season 1 
Numbers known:
Episode 1 Nina's Birthday; Nina's Big Adventure / debuted September 9, 2015
Episode 2 Nina the Nurse; Super Nina / debuted September 9, 2015
Episode 3 Nina the Kite Flyer; Nina's First Sleepover debuted September 9, 2015 - Description: Nina and Carlos wreck a kite together; Chelsea is a guest at Nina's home and they become space pirates (aired February 8, 2016 in Canada)
Episode 4: Nina Wants to Grow; Nina Takes the Stage / Air Date Unknown.
Episode 5:  Nina from Space; Nina Makes Music
Episode 6:  
Episode 7 Unplugged/Great (full titles Nina Unplugged; Nina the Great) debuted October 1, 2015 in US, October 10, 2015 in Canada
Episode 8: Nina and Papi Play Baseball; Nina the Shadow Chaser (aired February 22, 2016 in Canada) both segments also aired individually August 30, 2016
Episode 9: ?
Episode 10: ?
Episode 11 Nina Rides a Bike/Takes the Cake (full titles "Nina Rides a Bike" and "Nina Takes the Cake") debuted June 27, 2016, the latter also being available in part as a free short
Episode 12 Hijinx/Garden (full titles Nina's Henna Hijinx; Nina's Everything Garden) debuted November 3, 2015 in U.S., November 7, 2015 in Canada (aired March 14, 2016 as well)
Episode 13 Museum/Dives In (full titles Nina's Family Museum; Nina Dives In) debuted November 3, 2015 (November 14 in Canada)
Episode 14: Dog Sit/On Track (full titles Nina Dog Sits / Nina Gets on Track) April 7, 2016 on Sprout / September 11, 2016 on NBC / April 22, 2016 on the web
Episode 15: ?
Episode 16: ?
Episode 17: ?
Episode 18: Yard Sale/Papi's Best Day (full titles Nina and the Yard Sale / Nina and Papi's Best Day Ever) debuted September 13, 2016
Episode 19: ?
Episode 20: ?
Episode 21: ?
Episode 22: ?
Episode 23 Game Day / Karate debuted June 22, 2016
Episode 24: ?
Episode 25: ?
Episode 26 Color/Amigos debuted May 25, 2016

Not yet assigned number in above-reference list:
Nina Wants to Grow; Nina's Everything Theater
Nina's Show and Tell; Nina's Snow Day
Nina Delivers; Nina's Library Hop (aired March 7, 2016 in Canada) after having a pretend wedding between Star and Lucy, Nina mentions that the upcoming wedding between cousin Carmen and Jorge will be her first ever
Nina the Artist; Nina and the Missing Myna Bird (debuted October 17, 2015 in Canada)
Nina From Space; Nina Makes Music
Nina's Special Dress / Nina Hunts for Treasure debuted April 14, 2016, reran July 19, both segments aired individually August 29, 2016
Nina Cleans Her Room / Nina's Brother for the Day debuted April 18, 2016, scheduled for July 26 rerun, latter segment ran as "Brother for the Day" August 29, 2016 while the first retained its original title
Nina Gets Packing / Nina Camps It Up (aka Nina Camps Out) debuted April 25, 2016 on Sprout, August 28 on NBC
Nina the Babysitter / Nina's Thanksgiving August 27 on Sprout / August 30 on NBC
To Mami, Love Nina / Nina's Lemonade Stand May 6, 2016 on Sprout / September 6 on NBC

Season 2

Shorts
In addition to the main full episodes there are a number of titled shorts associated with them:
Nina's Birthday Party
Nina's Imagination
Nina's World EPK
Nina and Papi's Best Day Ever
Nina and the Yard Sale
Nina Cupcake
Nina Dog Sits aka Nina Dogs Sits is a short based on episode 14
Nina Good Night
Nina Shops with Abuelita
Nina Speaks Spanish
Nina with Something Completely Silly
Stretches with Abuelita
Tio Missing Party

Broadcast
The show premiered as part of NBC Kids on January 2, 2016, with new episodes airing weekly through February, scheduled for 10:00am on Saturday mornings.

On July 2, 2016, the show began airing on Telemundo's morning block MiTelemundo with two new episodes every Saturday morning at 9:30am–10:30am with Spanish audio track.

Internationally, the series can also be found on eToonz in South Africa.

Reception 

The series was positively received. Emily Ashby of Common Sense Media called the series "superb" and said that the series has "strong diversity, community, [and] family themes". She also argued that the series has themes of forging "strong relationships," solving issues, and embracing new situations, and stated the show's best aspect is its protagonist, who would "delight youngsters who tune in for her adventures."

Games
Nina's Big Adventure
Nina Match Up
Spot the Differences in Nina's World

References

External links
Nina's World Official Website

2010s American animated television series
2010s Canadian animated television series
2015 American television series debuts
2015 Canadian television series debuts
2018 American television series endings
2018 Canadian television series endings
English-language television shows
Hispanic and Latino American television
Television series by 9 Story Media Group
American children's animated fantasy television series
American flash animated television series
American prequel television series
American preschool education television series
Animated preschool education television series
Canadian children's animated fantasy television series
Canadian flash animated television series
Canadian preschool education television series
Animated television series about children
2010s preschool education television series
Spanish-language education television programming
Universal Kids original programming